Matea Samardžić (born 17 January 1995 in Split, Croatia) is a retired Croatian swimmer. She won a bronze medal in the 200m backstroke event at the 2016 European Aquatics Championships. She qualified for the 2016 Summer Olympics, where she will also compete in the 100m backstroke and the 400m individual medley events.

References

1995 births
Living people
Croatian female swimmers
Croatian female backstroke swimmers
European Aquatics Championships medalists in swimming
Swimmers at the 2016 Summer Olympics
Olympic swimmers of Croatia
Sportspeople from Split, Croatia
21st-century Croatian women